Qezel Uzan Rural District is in the Central District of Mianeh County, East Azerbaijan province, Iran. At the National Census of 2006, its population was 2,958 in 571 households. There were 2,673 inhabitants in 683 households at the following census of 2011. At the most recent census of 2016, the population of the rural district was 2,617 in 731 households. The largest of its 15 villages was Dadlu, with 658 people.

References 

Meyaneh County

Rural Districts of East Azerbaijan Province

Populated places in East Azerbaijan Province

Populated places in Meyaneh County